Just another Perl hacker, or JAPH, typically refers to a Perl program that prints "Just another Perl hacker," (the comma is canonical but is occasionally omitted).  Short JAPH programs are often used as signatures in online forums, or as T-shirt designs.  The phrase or acronym is also occasionally used (without code) for a signature.

JAPH programs are classically done using extremely obfuscated methods, in the spirit of the Obfuscated C Contest.  More recently, as the phenomenon has become well-known, the phrase is sometimes used in ordinary examples (without obfuscation).

The idea of using tiny Perl programs that print a signature as a signature was originated by Randal L. Schwartz, in his postings to the newsgroup comp.lang.perl. He wrote many of the JAPHs which are shown below.

Examples

JAPH program without obfuscation:

print "Just another Perl hacker,";

Embedding JAPH in opaque code:

$_='987;s/^(\d+)/$1-1/e;$1?eval:print"Just another Perl hacker,"';eval;

Decoding JAPH from a transposed string literal:

$_="krJhruaesrltre c a cnP,ohet";$_.=$1,print$2while s/(..)(.)//;

Printing out JAPH as separate processes:
for $i (0..4) {
    if (!fork) {
        $i == 0 or not { $SIG{INT} = sub { print "J" } } or
        $i == 1 or not { $SIG{INT} = sub { print "A" } } or
        $i == 2 or not { $SIG{INT} = sub { print "P" } } or
        $i == 3 or not { $SIG{INT} = sub { print "H" } } ;
        sleep $i;
        last;
    }
}

kill INT => $$;

Appearing as if it does something completely unrelated to printing JAPH:

$_ = "wftedskaebjgdpjgidbsmnjgc";
tr/a-z/oh, turtleneck Phrase Jar!/; print;

Forking processes to print out one letter each in the correct order:
@P=split//,".URRUU\c8R";@d=split//,"\nrekcah xinU / lreP rehtona tsuJ";sub p{
@p{"r$p","u$p"}=(P,P);pipe"r$p","u$p";++$p;($q*=2)+=$f=!fork;map{$P=$P[$f^ord
($p{$_})&6];$p{$_}=/ ^$P/ix?$P:close$_}keys%p}p;p;p;p;p;map{$p{$_}=~/^[P.]/&&
close$_}%p;wait until$?;map{/^r/&&<$_>}%p;$_=$d[$q];sleep rand(2)if/\S/;print

Using only Perl keywords (no punctuation):

not exp log srand xor s qq qx xor
s x x length uc ord and print chr
ord for qw q join use sub tied qx
xor eval xor print qq q q xor int
eval lc q m cos and print chr ord
for qw y abs ne open tied hex exp
ref y m xor scalar srand print qq
q q xor int eval lc qq y sqrt cos
and print chr ord for qw x printf
each return local x y or print qq
s s and eval q s undef or oct xor
time xor ref print chr int ord lc
foreach qw y hex alarm chdir kill
exec return y s gt sin sort split

Using only punctuation, no alphanumeric characters.  This breaks after Perl 5.30.0, as using $# and $* create fatal errors. This JAPH was written by Eric Roode and only works on Unix and Unix-like systems:

`$=`;$_=\%!;($_)=/(.)/;$==++$|;($.,$/,$,,$\,$",$;,$^,$#,$~,$*,$:,@%)=(
$!=~/(.)(.).(.)(.)(.)(.)..(.)(.)(.)..(.)......(.)/,$"),$=++;$.++;$.++;
$_++;$_++;($_,$\,$,)=($~.$"."$;$/$%[$?]$_$\$,$:$%[$?]",$"&$~,$#,);$,++
;$,++;$^|=$";`$_$\$,$/$:$;$~$*$%[$?]$.$~$*${#}$%[$?]$;$\$"$^$~$*.>&$=` 

A much shorter one, using only punctuation, based on the EyeDrops module:
''=~('(?{'.('-)@.)@_*([]@!@/)(@)@-@),@(@@+@)'
^'][)@]`}`]()`@.@]@%[`}%[@`@!#@%[').',"})')

ASCII art (to make this dromedary-shaped code work, the console size needs to be set to at least 119×48):
                                                       #
                                                   sub j(\$){($
                     P,$V)=                      @_;while($$P=~s:^
                 ([()])::x){                    $V+=('('eq$1)?-32:31
           }$V+=ord(  substr(                 $$P,0,1,""))-74} sub a{
          my($I,$K,$  J,$L)=@_               ;$I=int($I*$M/$Z);$K=int(
         $K*$M/$Z);$J=int($J*$M             /$Z);$L=int($L*$M/$Z); $G=$
         J-$I;$F=$L-$K;$E=(abs($          G)>=abs($F))?$G:$F;($E<0) and($
          I,$K)=($J,$L);$E||=.01       ;for($i=0;$i<=abs$E;$i++ ){ $D->{$K
                  +int($i*$F/$E)      }->{$I+int($i*$G/$E)}=1}}sub p{$D={};$
                 Z=$z||.01;map{    $H=$_;$I=$N=j$H;$K=$O=j$H;while($H){$q=ord
                substr($H,0,1,"" );if(42==$q){$J=j$H;$L=j$H}else{$q-=43;$L =$q
              %9;$J=($q-$L)/9;$L=$q-9*$J-4;$J-=4}$J+=$I;$L+=$K;a($I,$K,$J,$ L);
              ($I,$K)=($J,$L)}a($I,$K,$N,$O)}@_;my$T;map{$y=$_;map{ $T.=$D->{$y}
              ->{$_}?$\:' '}(-59..59);$T.="\n"}(-23..23);print"\e[H$T"}$w= eval{
              require Win32::Console::ANSI};$b=$w?'1;7;':"";($j,$u,$s,$t,$a,$n,$o
              ,$h,$c,$k,$p,$e,$r,$l,$C)=split/}/,'Tw*JSK8IAg*PJ[*J@wR}*JR]*QJ[*J'.
               'BA*JQK8I*JC}KUz]BAIJT]*QJ[R?-R[e]\RI'.'}Tn*JQ]wRAI*JDnR8QAU}wT8KT'.
               ']n*JEI*EJR*QJ]*JR*DJ@IQ[}*JSe*JD[n]*JPe*'.'JBI/KI}T8@?PcdnfgVCBRcP'.
                '?ABKV]]}*JWe*JD[n]*JPe*JC?8B*JE};Vq*OJQ/IP['.'wQ}*JWeOe{n*EERk8;'.
                  'J*JC}/U*OJd[OI@*BJ*JXn*J>w]U}CWq*OJc8KJ?O[e]U/T*QJP?}*JSe*JCnTe'.
                   'QIAKJR}*JV]wRAI*J?}T]*RJcJI[\]3;U]Uq*PM[wV]W]WCT*DM*SJ'.  'ZP[Z'.
                      'PZa[\]UKVgogK9K*QJ[\]n[RI@*EH@IddR[Q[]T]T]T3o[dk*JE'.  '[Z\U'.
                        '{T]*JPKTKK]*OJ[QIO[PIQIO[[gUKU\k*JE+J+J5R5AI*EJ00'.  'BCB*'.
                             'DMKKJIR[Q+*EJ0*EK';sub h{$\ = qw(% & @ x)[int    rand
                              4];map{printf  "\e[$b;%dm",int(rand 6)+101-60*   ($w
                               ||0);system(  "cls")if$w ;($A,$S)=    ($_[1],   $
                                _[0]);($M,   @,)= split  '}';for(     $z=256
                                ;$z>0; $z   -=$S){$S*=   $A;p @,}      sleep$_
                                [2];while   ($_[3]&&($    z+=$ S)       <=256){
                                p@,}}("".   "32}7D$j"     ."}AG".       "$u}OG"
                                ."$s}WG"    ."$t",""      ."24}("        ."IJ$a"
                                ."}1G$n"    ."}CO$o"     ."}GG$t"        ."}QC"
                                 ."$h}"      ."^G$e"    ."})IG"          ."$r",
                                 "32}?"       ."H$p}FG$e}QG$r".          "}ZC"
                                 ."$l",          "28}(LC" .""            ."".
                                 "$h}:"           ."J$a}EG".             "$c"
                                 ."}M"             ."C$k}ZG".            "$e"
                                 ."}"             ."dG$r","18"          ."}("
                                ."D;"            ."$C"  )}{h(16         ,1,1,0
                               );h(8,          .98,0,0   );h(16         ,1,1,1)
                               ;h(8.0         ,0.98,0,     1);         redo}###
                             #written                                 060204 by
                           #liverpole                                  @@@@@@@
                        #@@@@@@@@@@@

See also
"Hello, World!" program
Obfuscated Perl Contest
Perl golf

References

Further reading

External links
 Cultured Perl: The Elegance of JAPH
 Cpan.org, a collection of JAPHs at CPAN.
 How does this famous JAPh work? and Fun With Reserved Keywords  at Stack Overflow explain how blokhead's code works. 

Perl
English phrases
Software obfuscation
Test items in computer languages
Computer programming folklore